Barsha Siwakoti is a Nepali film actress and model who works predominantly in Nepali cinema. She made her career in Nepali film industry from her debut movie Nai Nabhannu La 2 (2014). She has also appeared in Pashupati Prasad (2016), Lappan Chhappan (2017) and Bir Bikram 2 (2019).

Filmography

Awards and nomination

References

External links 
 
 

Living people
21st-century Nepalese actresses
Nepalese female models
Nepalese film actresses
Place of birth missing (living people)
Date of birth missing (living people)
Actresses in Nepali cinema
1993 births